Anna Salter is an American psychologist, an internationally recognized expert on sexual predators, and a mystery novelist. Dr. Salter earned her MA from Tufts University and PhD from Harvard University. She has been a teaching fellow at both Tufts University and Harvard University. She is the author of several non-fiction books including Predators: Pedophiles, Rapists, and Other Sex Offenders: Who They Are, How They Operate, and How We Can Protect Our Children (2003), and Treating Child Sex Offenders and Victims (1988)

Education, clinical and research work
In 1968, Salter earned a BA in English and Philosophy from the University of North Carolina. Her Masters was in Child Development at Tufts University (1973), and her Ph.D. in Clinical Psychology and Public Practice at Harvard University (1977).

Salter has an emphasis in sex crimes. She has treated the victims of sex crimes, and also has  studied offenders. She has published several books and peer-reviewed articles on sex crimes, given many keynote speeches to professional and law enforcement groups, and consults with the Wisconsin Department of Corrections.

Additionally, Salter has interviewed numerous sex offenders and other criminals, compiling the videotaped interviews along with her commentary and analysis. Truth, Lies and Sex Offenders is for general audiences, and Sadistic Offenders: How They Think, What They Do is aimed at professionals and law enforcement.

Fiction
As of 2011, Salter has also published four mystery novels: Shiny Water, Fault Lines, White Lies and Prison Blues. The latter was nominated for a 2003 Edgar Award for best paperback original.

Selected bibliography
Sorted chronologically.

 "Treating Abusive Parents," Child Welfare, 64(4): 327–241, July–August 1985. (co-authored with S. Kairys and C. Richardson), 
 "Working with Abused Preschoolers: A Guide for Caretakers." Child Welfare, 64(4): 343–356, July–August 1985. (co-authored with C. Richardson and P. Martin)
 Treating Child Sex Offenders and Victims. Newbury Park, CA: Sage Publications, 1988
 "Response to the 'Abuse of the child sexual abuse accommodation syndrome.'" Journal of Child Sexual Abuse. V. 1(4), pp. 173–177, 1992.
 Transforming Trauma: A Guide to Understanding and Treating Survivors of Child Sexual Abuse. Newbury Park, CA: Sage Publications, 1995
 "Confessions of a whistle blower: Lessons learned." Ethics and Behavior. 8(2), 1998, pp. 115–124
 Predators: Pedophiles, Rapists, and Other Sex Offenders: Who They Are, How They Operate, and How We Can Protect Our Children. New York: Basic Books, 2003.

References

20th-century American novelists
21st-century American novelists
American mystery writers
American women psychologists
21st-century American psychologists
American psychology writers
American women novelists
Women science writers
Women mystery writers
20th-century American women writers
21st-century American women writers
Harvard University alumni
Year of birth missing (living people)
Living people
Tufts University School of Arts and Sciences alumni
University of North Carolina alumni
American women non-fiction writers
20th-century American non-fiction writers
21st-century American non-fiction writers